Franchet is a surname. Notable people with the surname include:

 Adrien René Franchet  (1834–1900), French botanist
 Louis Franchet d'Espèrey (1856–1942), French general during World War I

French-language surnames